The Motorcraft 2150 is a Ford (also used by AMC) 2-barrel carburetor manufactured from 1973 through 1983, based heavily on its predecessor, the Autolite 2100 carburetor.

The 2150 improved on the 2100s design through the introduction of a variable air bleed system, which keeps the air to fuel mixture better balanced throughout the carburetor's full range of operation. The 2150 models from 1983 to 1986 were electronic feedback carburetors equipped with Ford's EEC-IV.

Variations
Unlike the Autolite 2100, the Motorcraft 2150 was available only in two venturi sizes. Both were available in manual and automatic transmission configurations.

1.08 venturi, 287 CFM
These 2150s were used on Ford engines up to the 302 Windsor in cubic displacement.

Ford engines commonly equipped with the 1.08 venturi 2150:
 1975–1986 2.8 L V6
 1982–1983 3.8 L Essex V6
 1973–1983  I6
Note: The 250-I6 is derived from the Falcon line (144-170-200). U.S. versions were only available with an integral cast head and intake making them only able to accept a one-barrel carb. Foreign versions were also made with typical two-piece intake and head.
 1973–1983  Windsor 351W 5.8L light truck/van

The last Ford vehicles to leave the factory with 2150 carburetors were 1986 Aerostars equipped with the 2.8 L V6.

1.21 venturi, 351 CFM
These larger 2150s were generally used in large Ford passenger cars and trucks equipped with 335-series engines. These were also used, with the addition of an altitude compensator, on Jeep Grand Wagoneers equipped with the AMC 360 V8.

Ford engines commonly equipped with the 1.21 venturi 2150:

1973-1982  Windsor
1977-1982  351M
1977-1979 

AMC engine equipped with the 1.2 venturi 2150 with altitude compensator:

1981-1991 AMC  Gen 3 “Tall Deck”

See also
List of Ford engines

References

External links
Are all 2150 Carbs the same? What is the difference? '79 351M
Holley Remanufactured Catalog

Carburettors
Ford Motor Company